Bajheri is a medium village located in Muzaffarnagar district, Uttar Pradesh, India. It is 3 km away from Muzaffarnagar City. This village was founded around 300 years ago by Mr Bundu who also owned a bagh (garden) about 1000 bighas, which is about one-third the area of the whole village.

Demographics
This village consists 97% of Muslims and 3% of Dalit. It is a Muslim Gaur majority village. Local Languages are Urdu and Hindi. The total population of the village is 5957 and number of houses are 989. Female Population is 48.0%. The village's literacy rate is 92.4%.

The village has a "madarsa" (Jamiyatul Abrar) where Islamic study is taught it also has a government school (bajheri junior high school). Sayyad Hasan is the pradhan.

 Central Warehousing Corporation Godown sheds in Bajheri, Muzaffarnagar (India). This is stocked by Food Corporation of India.It is the largest godown in asia.

Notable people 

 Salim Gaur,A Bollywood Actor

Villages in Muzaffarnagar district